Madifushi (Dhivehi: މަޑިފުށި) is one of the inhabited islands of Thaa Atoll.

History

On December 26, 2004, the 2004 tsunami left the island devastated.

Geography
Madifushi is the fifth largest inhabited island by area in the atoll.

Areas
There are a number of unofficial areas the locals of the island uses in conversation.

Uthuru Avah / Fithebai Avah

 Musalha Kotti

Dhekunu Avah / Garagui Avah

 Vahbura
 Gaburu City

Demography

Economy
Madifushi is known for its many boats and its ship transportation business.

References

Islands of the Maldives